The Ninth Street station was a station on the demolished section of the BMT Fifth Avenue Line in Brooklyn, New York City. Served by trains of the BMT Culver Line and BMT Fifth Avenue Line, and had 2 tracks and 1 island platform. The station was opened on August 15, 1889 at the intersection of Fifth Avenue and Ninth Street and had connections to the Smith and Ninth Streets Line and Hamilton Avenue Line streetcars. The next stop to the north was Third Street. The next stop to the south was 16th Street. It closed on May 31, 1940.

References

BMT Fifth Avenue Line stations
Railway stations in the United States opened in 1889
Railway stations closed in 1940
Former elevated and subway stations in Brooklyn